Yamashina Mido, also known as Yamashina Hongan-ji (山科本願寺), was a Buddhist temple in Kyoto which was used as a fortress by the Ikkō-ikki, an organization of warrior monks and lay zealots who opposed samurai rule.

History
The temple was founded by Rennyo, abbot of the Jōdo Shinshū sect whose preachings spurred the creation of the Ikkō-ikki. Following the 1465 destruction of the chief Jōdo Shinshū temple, the Hongan-ji in Kyoto, Rennyo spent roughly a decade in the provinces.

He returned to Kyoto in 1478; the construction of the Yamashina Mido was completed in 1483, becoming the center of the Jōdo Shinshū sect. Rennyo remained there for over a decade, leaving in 1496 and traveling to the area now known as Osaka, where he would found the Ishiyama Hongan-ji.

Over the next several decades, the Yamashina Mido remained the central headquarters of the sect, even as the Ishiyama Hongan-ji and the city of Osaka grew in size and prominence. In the 1530s, the Ikkō-ikki began to undertake attacks on major religious centers in the cities as other bands of Ikkō mobs had done against samurai rulers in the provinces. The mobs attacked the Nichiren Kenpon-ji in Sakai, the Kōfuku-ji and Kasuga shrines in Nara, among other sites, and incurred the ire of both clergy and lay adherents to Nichiren and other sects.

Kyoto, meanwhile, had been in the process, for decades, of being rebuilt following the extensive destruction of the city in the Ōnin War of 1467-1477. The rising urban merchant class consisted largely of adherents to the Nichiren sect of Buddhism, and tensions soon led to attacks on the Ikkō-ikki in the city. In 1532, Hosokawa Harumoto and Rokkaku Sadayori led a combination of samurai and townspeople in attacking and destroying the Yamashina Mido.

Shonyo, abbot of Yamashina, fled along with many of his followers, taking refuge in the Ishiyama Honganji. He successfully resisted another attack by Hosokawa there, and the Ishiyama Honganji remained the headquarters of the sect for almost fifty years.

References
Turnbull, Stephen (2005). 'Japanese Fortified Temples and Monasteries AD 710-1602.' Oxford: Osprey Publishing. pp9–10.

Buildings and structures completed in 1483
15th-century Buddhist temples
Former Buddhist temples
Former buildings and structures in Japan
1478 establishments in Asia
1532 disestablishments in Asia
Historic Sites of Japan
Jōdo Shin temples
Rennyo
History of Jōdo Shinshū
Buddhism in the Muromachi period